Robert Joseph Gay is an American Paleontologist known for his work in the Chinle and Kayenta Formations in the southwest United States. He is known for the discovery of the first occurrence of Crosbysaurus from Utah, as well as his studies of cannibalism in Coelophysis and sexual dimorphism in Dilophosaurus. Since 2014, Gay has taken high school students to the Chinle of Comb Ridge, Utah, and he is currently making new discoveries there. In December 2017, he and coauthors Xavier A. Jenkins of Arizona State University and John R. Foster of the Museum of Moab formally published their study on the oldest known dinosaur from Utah, a neotheropod that is likely an animal similar to Coelophysis. Robert Gay is currently the Education Director at the Colorado Canyons Association.

Discoveries 
In the summer of 2015, Gay discovered the first occurrence of Crosbysaurus from the Triassic of Utah. In 2017, Robert Gay and others published their discovery on the oldest known dinosaur from the State of Utah, a small Coelophysis-like neotheropod from the Upper Triassic Chinle Formation.

Publications and Abstracts 
Gay , R. J., Huttenlocker , A. K., Irmis , R.B., Stegner , M.A., & Uglesich , J. (2020). Paleontology of Bears Ears National Monument (Utah, USA): History of exploration, study, and designation. Geology of the Intermountain West, 7, 205-241.

Jenkins, Xavier A.; Foster, John R.; Gay, Robert J. First unambiguous dinosaur specimen from the Upper Triassic Chinle formation in Utah. Geology of the Intermountain West, [S.l.], v. 4, p. 231-242, Dec. 2017. ISSN 2380-7601.

Gay RJ, Aude IS. (2015). The first occurrence of the enigmatic archosauriform Crosbysaurus Heckert 2004 from the Chinle Formation of southern Utah.

Gay, Robert (2001). "New specimens of Dilophosaurus wetherilli (Dinosauria: Theropoda) from the early Jurassic Kayenta Formation of northern Arizona". Western Association of Vertebrate Paleontologists annual meeting volume Mesa, Arizona 1: 1.

Gay, Robert (2005). "Evidence for sexual dimorphism in the Early Jurassic theropod dinosaur, Dilophosaurus and a comparison with other related forms In: Carpenter, Ken, ed. The Carnivorous Dinosaurs". The Carnivorous Dinosaurs. Indiana University Press. pp. 277–283. .

Gay, R.J. (2001). "An unusual adaptation in the caudal vertebrae of Coelophysis bauri (Dinosauria: Theropoda)". PaleoBios 21: 55.

Lockley, Martin G.; Gierlinski, Gerard D.; Houck, Karen; Lim, Jong-Deock; Kim, Kyung Soo; Kim, Dal-Yong; Kim, Tae Hyeong; Kang, Seung-Hyeop; Hunt-Foster, ReBecca; Li, Rihui; Chesser, Christopher; Gay, Rob; Dubicka, Zofia; Cart, Ken; Wright, Kristy. 2014 “New Excavations at the Mill Canyon Dinosaur Track Site (Cedar Mountain Formation, Lower Cretaceous) of eastern Utah In Lockley and Lucas, eds., Fossil footprints of western North America. New Mexico Museum of Natural History and Science Bulletin no. 62, pp 287–300.

References

Living people
American paleontologists
University of Arizona alumni
Year of birth missing (living people)